This is a list of cities/towns in South Australia by urban centre population.

Largest Urban Centres and Localities by population

Urban Centres and Localities (UCLs) represent areas of concentrated urban development with populations of 200 people or more. Areas in a state or territory that are not included in an UCL are considered to be ‘rural’. UCLs are not an official definition of towns.

Suburbs of Adelaide are not included, with the exception of Gawler, Mount Barker, Crafers-Bridgewater and Nairne, which can all be seen as semi-rural suburbs but also as separate towns.

*Uraidila and Summertown are recorded separately until 2011 when they are merged.

25 largest local government areas by population

Local government areas are the main units of local government in Australia. They may be termed cities, shires, councils or other names, but they all function similarly.

See also
 Demographics of Australia
 List of cities in Australia
 List of places in New South Wales by population
 List of places in the Northern Territory by population
 List of places in Queensland by population
 List of places in Tasmania by population
 List of places in Victoria by population
 List of places in Western Australia by population

Notes and references

South Australia
South Australia, Places by population
Places by population
Demographics of South Australia